Dibyendu Bhattacharya is an Indian actor who works in Hindi cinema and Bengali cinema And web series. He is best known for his role in Dev D. and as Layak Talukdar in Criminal Justice, 2019 Hotstar Web series. His upcoming Bengali Movie Mirza is to be released in Eid 2023.

Filmography

Films

Television

References

External links
 
 

Male actors in Hindi cinema
Living people
Indian male film actors
21st-century Indian male actors
Place of birth missing (living people)
Indian male television actors
1975 births